Henry Wassén, (24 August 1908 – 1996) was a Swedish social anthropologist and museum head.

Life 
Wassén was born in Göteborg, the son of a merchant. He graduated with a Studentexamen 1928 and a licentiate degree in Göteborg 1936. He started his career as a teaching assistant at Gothenburg ethnografic museum 1930 and became a curator at the museum in 1954. He was head of the museum between 1968–73 and was awarded the honorary title of Professor in 1972.

Wassén made several scientific expeditions to among others Colombia, Panama and Central America.

Alongside his work at the museum he had a number of voluntary obligations such as board member at Sveriges museimannaförening, chairman of their Gothenburg faction and board member at The Maritime Museum, Gothenburg. He was a corresponding member of the Colombian Academy of Exact, Physical and Natural Sciences and a member of various scientific societies in Argentina, Brazil, Colombia, Guatemala, Panama, Peru and Mexico.

From his scientific work he published many books, some in a popular science style. Wassén died in his hometown of Göteborg in 1996.

Selected publications 
 Odhners historia : illustrerad krönika över en maskin att räkna med : ett apropå till 100-årsminnet av W.T Odhners födelse 1845, 1945
 Mexikos, Central- och Sydamerikas arkeologi, published by Gothenburg ethnographic museum, 1963
 Some words on the Cuna Indians and especially their "mola"-garments, 1964
 The use of some specific kinds of South American Indian snuff and related paraphernalia, with appendix: Einige Bemerkungen zur Anwendung und Wirkungsweise des Epena-Schnupfpulvers der Waika-Indianer av Georg J. Seitz, 1965
 Four Swedish anthropologists in Argentina in the first decades of the 20th century: biobibliographical notes, 1967
 Mola: Cuna-indiansk textilkonst : Göteborgs etnografiska museum utställer i Röhsska konstslöjdsmuseet: 6 september-oktober 1968, 1968
 A medicine-man's implements and plants in a Tiahuanacoid tomb in Highland Bolivia, co-author Wolmar E. Bondeson ..., 1972

References 
 Bra böckers lexikon, 1980.
 http://runeberg.org/vemardet/1977/1086.html
 http://runeberg.org/vemarvem/gota65/1120.html
 http://libris.kb.se/hitlist?d=libris&q=Wass%C3%A9n,%20S.%20Henry

1908 births
1996 deaths
Swedish anthropologists
People from Gothenburg
20th-century anthropologists